Oğuzhan  is a common masculine Turkish given name. "Oğuzhan" is composed of two words, "Oğuz" and "han"; Oğuz is a given name, while "han" means literally "khan". Thus, "Oğuzhan" means "Oğuz khan". The modern name derives from the name and title of Oghuz Khagan, a legendary Turkic leader.

There are various theories on the meaning of "Oğuz". The most prominent explanation is that it is composed of "ok" and "z". In modern Turkish as well as Proto-Turkic, "ok" means "arrow". However, in Proto-Turkic, "ok" also means "clan" or "nation". Again, only in Proto-Turkic, "-z" is the plural suffix. Therefore "okz" means "clans", "nations", or "arrows" in Proto-Turkic. In modern Turkish, "-z" is not the plural suffix anymore, having been replaced with "-lar" and "-ler".

"Oğuz" was used both as given names and as names of some of the Turkish clans. Oghuz Turks are the southwestern branch of Turkish clan system. "Gökoğuz" was a group of Oghuz Turks who migrated to northwest and were the ancestors of the modern Gagauz people. There are also groups named as Üçoğuz (Three Oğuz), Sekizoğuz (Eight Oğuz), Dokuzoğuz (Nine Oğuz), etc.

People
 Oğuzhan Aşkar (born 1980), Turkish sociologist-writer
 Oghuz Khagan, a legendary and semi-mythological Turkic leader
 Oğuz Han Aynaoğlu (born 1992), Danish-Turkish footballer
 Oğuzhan Azğar (born 1993), Turkish footballer
 Oğuzhan Bahadır (born 1979), Turkish football goalkeeper
 Oğuzhan Bıyık (born 1986), Turkish footballer
 Oğuzhan Kefkir (born 1991), Turkish-German footballer
 Oğuzhan Özyakup (born 1992), Turkish footballer
 Oğuzhan Tüzün (born 1982), Turkish sport shooter
 Oğuzhan Yeşil (born 1994), Turkish freediver

Turkish masculine given names